Tae, also spelled Tai or Thae, is a rare Korean family name, a single-syllable masculine Korean given name, and an element used in many two-syllable Korean given names. As a family name, it is written with a hanja meaning "great", while in given names, it may have a variety of meanings depending on the hanja used to write it.

As a family name
As a rare Korean family name, Tae is written with only one hanja, meaning "great". They are a noble clan directly descended from the royal family of the Balhae dynasty. The clan ancestor is Dae Jung-sang, the father of the founder of Balhae, Dae Jo-young. The 2000 South Korean Census found 8,165 people with the family name Tae. In a study by the National Institute of the Korean Language based on 2007 application data for South Korean passports, it was found that 28.5% of people with that surname spelled it in Latin letters as Tai in their passports, vs. 57.1% as Tae. People with this surname trace their origins to several bon-gwan, including Namwon and Yeongsun in what is now South Korea and Hyeopgye in what is now North Korea.

People with this family name include:
 Tae Wan-son (born 1915 -1988), South Korean politician and businessman who served as minister of Construction Department. 
Tae Hyun-sil (born 1941), South Korean actress
Thae Yong-ho (born 1962), North Korean diplomat who defected to South Korea in 2016
Tae Yoon (born 1992), South Korean football player in India

In given names

Hanja
In given names, the meaning of "Tae" depends on the hanja used to write it. There are 20 hanja with this reading on the South Korean government's official list of hanja which may be used in given names; they are:

 (클 태 keul tae): "great"
 (클 태 keul tae): "exalted"
 (게으를 태 ge-eureul tae): "idle"
 (거의 태 geo-ui tae, 위태할 태 witaehal tae): "almost", "dangerous"
 (모습 태 moseup tae): "form", "shape"
 (일 태 il tae): "to wash"
 (바꿀 태 bakkul tae): "to change"
 (별 태 byeol tae): "platform"
 (아이 밸 태 ai bael tae): "unborn child"
 (나라 이름 태 nara ireum tae): Tai, an ancient city-state in modern Shaanxi, China
 (볼기 칠 태 bolgi chil tae): "to flog"
 (이끼 태 ikki tae): "lichen"
 (밟을 태 balbeul tae): "to trample"
 (태풍 태, taepung tae): "typhoon"
 (티타늄 태 titanyum tae): "titanium"
 (옥 무늬 태 ok munui tae): "jade pattern"
 (복어 태 bugeo tae): "blowfish"
 (벗을 탈 beoseul tae): "to undress"
 (아름다울 태 areumdaul tae): "beautiful"
 (미칠 태 michil tae): "to arrive"

As name element
Given names containing this element include:

First syllable
Tae-min
Tae-hee
Tae-ho
Tae-hyun
Tae-joon
Tae-soo
Tae-suk
Tae-sung
Tae-won
Tae-hyung

 
Tae-woo
Tae-wook
Tae-woong
Tae-yeon
Tae-yong
Tae-young
Tae-il
Tae-ri
Tae-ha

Second syllable
Hyun-tae
Ji-tae
Joon-tae
Ki-tae
Kyung-tae
Young-tae
Min-tae

See also
List of Korean family names
List of Korean given names

References

Korean-language surnames
Korean masculine given names